Moonshine is the third studio album by Australian singer-songwriter Brian Cadd. It was released in Australia in August 1974 by Bootleg Records and on Chelsea Records internationally.

The album peaked at number 11 in the Australian Kent Music Report album charts. It was certified gold in Australia in November 1974.

At the 1974 Australian Radio Records Awards, the album won Best Male Vocal Album. This was the third consecutive year Cadd won the award.

Track listing
All tracks written by Brian Cadd

Side A
 "Think It Over" - 3:42
 "Let Go" - 4:18
 "Moonshine" - 2:54
 "Sweet Rock 'N' Roll" - 4:47
 "Fire At Shepards Flat" - 4:00

Side B
 "All In The Way (They Use My Face)" - 4:03
 "Mr. Music" - 4:05
 "Song For Wendy" - 2:16
 "Spring Hill County Breakdown" - 3:12
 "I Need Love"  - 4:15
 "Rich Man (Poor Man, Beggar Man)" - 5:12

Charts

Certifications

References

Brian Cadd albums
1974 albums